Homestead is a disused railway station located in Homestead, Pennsylvania. The station was built in 1906 by the Pennsylvania Railroad. It was added to the National Register of Historic Places on December 26, 1985, as the Homestead Pennsylvania Railroad Station.

Currently, the station is used by Allegheny County District Attorney's Office as its Regional Support and Training Center at the Waterfront.

See also
National Register of Historic Places listings in Allegheny County, Pennsylvania

References

External links

Homestead Train Whistle Ringtone, Locally Toned

Railway stations on the National Register of Historic Places in Pennsylvania
Railway stations in the United States opened in 1906
Transportation buildings and structures in Allegheny County, Pennsylvania
Former Pennsylvania Railroad stations
Homestead, Pennsylvania
National Register of Historic Places in Allegheny County, Pennsylvania
Former railway stations in Allegheny County, Pennsylvania
1906 establishments in Pennsylvania